Jemondre Dickens (born 22 April 1998) is a South African soccer player who plays as a forward for South African Premier Division club Chippa United. He has been capped for the South Africa national team. He also spent time with TS Sporting on loan in December 2019.

References

1998 births
Living people
South African soccer players
Association football forwards
Baroka F.C. players
TS Sporting F.C. players
Chippa United F.C. players
South African Premier Division players
National First Division players
South Africa international soccer players